The 2017 Rhondda Cynon Taf Council election took place on Thursday 4 May 2017 to elect members of Rhondda Cynon Taf County Borough Council in Wales. This was the same day as other 2017 United Kingdom local elections. The previous full council election took place on 3 May 2012 and the next full election took place in 2022.

Election result
Seventy four council seats across fifty two electoral wards were up for election. Labour remained in control of the council, though lost thirteen seats overall, while Plaid Cymru doubled their numbers to eighteen. Labour council leader Andrew Morgan described the result as "a reasonably good outcome considering the circumstances we have been facing", while Plaid Cymru group leader Pauline Jarman said she was "slightly disappointed". A "shock" result was the election of a councillor from new party, The Cynon Valley Party, to the Penrhiwceiber ward.

|}
[a] - includes one councillor and 888 votes for the Labour and Co-operative parties

Ward results

Aberaman North (2 seats)

Aberaman South (2 seats)

Abercynon (2 seats)

Aberdare East (2 seats)

Aberdare West / Llwydcoed (3 seats)

Beddau (1 seat)

Brynna (1 seat)

Church Village (1 seat)

Cilfynydd (1 seat)

Cwm Clydach (1 seat)

Cwmbach (1 seat)

Cymmer (2 seats)

Ferndale (2 seats)

Gilfach Goch (1 seat)

Glyncoch (1 seat)

Graig (1 seat)

Hawthorn (1 seat)

Hirwaun (1 seat)

Llanharan (1 seat)

Llanharry (1 seat)

Llantrisant Town (1 seat)

Llantwit Fardre (2 seats)

Llwyn-y-pia (1 seat)

Maerdy (1 seats)

Mountain Ash East (1 seat)

Mountain Ash West (2 seats)

Penrhiwceiber (2 seats)

Pentre (2 seats)

Pen-Y-Graig (2 seats)

Pen-Y-Waun (1 seat)

Pont-Y-Clun (2 seats)

Pontypridd Town (1 seat)

Porth (2 seats)

Rhigos (1 seat)

Rhondda (2 seats)

Rhydfelen Central / Ilan (1 seat)

Taffs Well (1 seat)

Talbot Green (1 seat)

Ton-Teg (2 seats)

Tonypandy (1 seat)

Tonyrefail East (2 seats)

Tonyrefail West (1 seat)

Trallwng (1 seat)

Trealaw (1 seat)

Treforest (1 seat)

Treherbert (2 seats)

Treorchy (3 seats)

Tylorstown (2 seats)

Tyn-Y-Nant (1 seat)

Ynyshir (1 seat)

Ynysybwl (1 seat)

Ystrad (2 seats)

By-elections between 2017 and 2022

Rhondda (2019)
A by-election took place on 4 July 2019 after the death of Labour councillor, Robert Smith. The turnout was 28%.

Ynyshir (2019)
A by-election took place on 5 December 2019 after Plaid Cymru councillor, Darren Macey, resigned his seat because of a conflict of interest with his new job for RCT Sporting Heroes. The seat was won by Labour.

Llantwit Fardre (2021)
A by-election took place on 6 May 2021 after a Conservative councillor, Mike Diamond, resigned his seat for personal reasons.

Penrhiwceiber (2021)
A by-election took place on 6 May 2021 to fill a vacancy after Cynon Valley Party councillor, Gavin Williams, was removed from his position after being absent from council meetings for more than six months. Williams stood as an Independent at the by-election.

Tyn-y-nant (2021)
A by-election took place on 22 July 2021 following the death of long-standing Labour councillor, Clayton Willis.

References

2017 Welsh local elections
2017